The Cal Poly San Luis Obispo College of Engineering is the engineering college of the California Polytechnic State University, San Luis Obispo in San Luis Obispo, California. It has nearly 250 faculty members and more than 6,000 students enrolled in fourteen bachelor's and in eleven master's degree programs through nine engineering departments. Its facilities house more than 80 classrooms, laboratories and work spaces occupying more than 160,000 square feet. In the 2021 U.S. News & World Report "America's Best Colleges" edition, the College of Engineering is ranked 8th out of 220 public and private undergraduate engineering schools in the U.S. where doctorates are not offered.

General information

The College of Engineering is the largest of Cal Poly's six colleges, with 6,091 students (5,829 undergraduate and 262 graduate students), or 28.7%, of the 21,242 enrolled at the university in Fall 2019. For engineering freshmen entering Fall 2020, Cal Poly accepted 31.01% of applicants (5,436 accepted/17,531 applied); admitted freshmen had an average GPA of 4.16, with the middle 50% range of ACT composite scores 29-34 and 1350-1520 for the SAT composite score (out of 1600). Cal Poly San Luis Obispo offers 4+1 Master (5-year) programs for some engineering majors. The College of Engineering has almost 80 student clubs which offer project, leadership, service, conference and competition opportunities. According to the college, 90% of graduates are employed or enrolled in graduate school within a year after graduation.

Departments

Aerospace Engineering

The Aerospace Engineering program was ranked by U.S. News & World Reports 2021 "America's Best Colleges" report as 2nd overall (of the 5 programs ranked in engineering schools whose highest degree is a Master's).

Civil and Environmental Engineering

The Bachelor of Science degree program stresses the team design concept and systems approach to problem solving and is accredited by the Engineering Accreditation Commission of the Accreditation Board for Engineering and Technology (ABET).

The Civil Engineering program was ranked by ''U.S. News & World Reports 2021 "America's Best Colleges" report as 2nd overall (of the 19 programs ranked in engineering schools whose highest degree is a Master's).

Civil Engineering offers courses specializing in  
 Geotechnical
 Structural
 Transportation
 Water Resources

Environmental Engineering offers courses specializing in:
 Air Pollution Control
 Water and Wastewater Treatment Design
 Hazardous Waste Management
 Solid Waste Management
 Industrial Pollution Prevention

Prior to 1977, there was no Civil Engineering Department. The Transportation Engineering Department offered civil engineering courses as well as courses in transportation engineering.  The Environmental Engineering Department began in 1969, but when Warren Baker was hired as president of the university, in 1979, he combined the Environmental Engineering and Transportation Engineering departments into the Civil & Environmental Engineering Department.

The Civil and Environmental Engineering Department also includes the 2008, 2009, 2010 Robert Ridgway Award-winning Society of Civil Engineers (student chapter of the American Society of Civil Engineers) and the American Society of Civil Engineers 2010, 2011 and 2012 National Concrete Canoe Competition champions. The Society of Environmental Engineers placed 2nd for best chapter in AWMA in 2009. The Chi Epsilon Honors Society chapter won the inaugural Chi Epsilon (Pacific District) Cup, and are now ranked as the #1 chapter in California and Hawaii.

The Civil Engineering program was ranked by U.S. News & World Reports 2020 "America's Best Colleges" report as 3rd overall (of 11 programs in  engineering schools whose highest degree is a Master's).

Clubs/Organizations Affiliated with the Department:
  American Society of Civil Engineers (ASCE) Student Chapter
  Society of Environmental Engineers (SENVE)
  Engineers Without Borders (EWB) - Cal Poly
  Institute of Transportation Engineers (ITE)
  Cal Poly RainWorks
  Cal Poly Biodiesel Project

Computer Engineering

The Computer Engineering major is an interdisciplinary program resting on the foundations of two departments: Computer Science and Electrical Engineering, and it is fully accredited by ABET.

The Computer Engineering program was ranked by U.S. News & World Reports 2021 "America's Best Colleges" report as 2nd overall (of the 21 programs ranked in engineering schools whose highest degree is a Master's).

Computer Science and Software Engineering
The department offers Bachelor of Science and Master of Science programs accredited by the ABET. B.S. degrees are available in Computer Science, Software Engineering and Computer Engineering; an M.S. degree is available in Computer Science.  The Software Engineering major began in Fall 2003 as the first undergraduate software engineering major in California.

Electrical Engineering

The Electrical Engineering Department offers Bachelor of Science and Master of Science programs in electrical engineering, which are accredited by the ABET. The department supports interdisciplinary programs such as Computer Engineering and many graduate as well as undergraduate students are served by the department.

Specializations:
 Communications
 Computers
 Electronics
 Controls
 Power

The Electrical Engineering program was ranked by ''U.S. News & World Reports 2021 "America's Best Colleges" report (includes both private and public universities) as 2nd overall (of the 23 programs in engineering schools whose highest degree is a Master's).

General and Biomedical Engineering

In the past, Biomedical Engineering was a concentration within the general engineering major. In 2005, the program was implemented with its own stand-alone curriculum.

Specializations:
 Biochemical Engineering
 Bioengineering
 Biomedical Engineering
 Integrated Technology Management
 Materials Engineering
 Water Engineering

Clubs/Organizations Affiliated with the Department:
 Medical Design
 Biomedical Engineering Society

Industrial and Manufacturing Engineering (IME)

The program was established in 1956, the Industrial and Manufacturing Engineering Department trains students to design, install, and improve systems that integrate people, technology, materials, and information.

Degrees offered:
 B.S. Industrial Engineering
 B.S. Manufacturing Engineering
 M.S. Industrial Engineering
 5 Year B.S.+M.S. Industrial Engineering Blended Program

The Industrial/Manufacturing Engineering program was ranked by U.S. News & World Reports 2021 "America's Best Colleges" report as 1st overall (of 2 programs ranked in engineering schools whose highest degree is a Master's).

Materials Engineering

Cal Poly Materials Engineering is the only primarily undergraduate materials engineering program of the 53 Materials Science and Engineering departments in the United States.

Mechanical Engineering

The Mechanical Engineering program was ranked by ''U.S. News & World Report'''s 2021 "America's Best Colleges" report as 3rd overall (of the 30 programs ranked in engineering schools whose highest degree is a Master's).

The program is affiliated with ASME.

Centers and Institutes
 Center for Sustainability in Engineering 
 Electric Power Institute
 Global Waste Research Institute 
 National Pool Industry Research Center
 Poly GAIT (Laboratory for Global Automatic Identification Technologies)

See also
 Engineering colleges in California
 List of engineering programs in the California State University

References

External links
 California Polytechnic State University
 California Polytechnic State University College of Engineering
 Cal Poly SLO Formula SAE Team
 Cal Poly Society of Civil Engineers

Engineering universities and colleges in California
Universities and colleges in San Luis Obispo County, California
Buildings and structures in San Luis Obispo, California
California Polytechnic State University